, was a great-grandson of Emperor Ling of Han who settled in Japan with his son Tsuga no omi. He became the founding ancestor of the Yamato no Aya clan. His name is also recorded as 阿知吉師.

From the Nihon Shoki (289 AD):

See also
 Han Dynasty
 Japanese clans
 Hata clan

References

Chinese Buddhists
4th-century Chinese people
4th-century Japanese people